KEX may refer to:

KEX (AM), a radio station (1190 AM) licensed to Portland, Oregon, United States
KEX Hotel, an Iceland-owned hotel in Portland, Oregon, United States.
Kex, the name of a Mandalorian in Star Wars: Knights of the Old Republic II: The Sith Lords.
Kansai Commodities Exchange, a futures exchange in Japan
The NYSE ticker symbol for the Kirby Corporation
The dried stems and seeds of the Poison hemlock or similar umbelliferous plants.
File extension .kex for KEDIT KEXX macros, a subset of REXX
Potassium ethyl xanthate